Pinkney And Gerrick Woods is a 62.7 hectare biological Site of Special Scientific Interest in North Yorkshire, England notified in 1954.

SSSIs are designated by Natural England, formally English Nature, which uses the 1974–1996 county system. This means there is no grouping of SSSIs by Redcar and Cleveland unitary authority, or North Yorkshire which is the relevant ceremonial county. As such Pinkney and Gerrick Woods is one of 18 SSSIs in the Cleveland area of search.

References

Sources
 English Nature citation sheet for the site  (accessed 6 August 2006)

External links
 English Nature (SSSI information)
 Site boundary map at English Nature's "Nature on the Map" website

Sites of Special Scientific Interest in Cleveland, England
Sites of Special Scientific Interest notified in 1954
Forests and woodlands of North Yorkshire
Loftus, North Yorkshire